Karl Alexander von Müller (20 December 1882 – 13 December 1964) was a German historian. His immediate disciples were Nazi politicians and academics such as Baldur von Schirach, Rudolf Heß, Hermann Göring, Walter Frank, Wilhelm Grau, Wilfried Euler, Clemens August Hoberg, Hermann Kellenbenz, Karl Richard Ganzer, Ernst Hanfstaengl and Klaus Schickert. However, due to his political openness, other non-Nazi historians such as Karl Bosl, Alois Hundhammer, Heinz Gollwitzer and even Wolfgang Hallgarten also studied under Müller. He had also taught the medievalist Edward Rand.

Life
Müller was born in Munich, the son of the Bavarian culture minister Ludwig August von Müller. He studied law and history at the Wilhelmsgymnasium München in 1901 and from 1903 to 1904 studied at the University of Oxford on a Rhodes Scholarship. In 1908 he gained his PhD under Sigmund von Riezler, with a thesis entitled Bavaria in the year 1866 and the appointment of Prince Hohenlohe.  In the summer of 1919 Müller together with Gottfried Feder gave lectures on political education at Munich University that were funded by the army with a view to countering socialist revolutionary fervor. During one course, he identified Adolf Hitler's "rhetorical talent". As a result of this recommendation, Hitler was selected as a political officer in the team of instructors that were sent to lecture at a German Army camp near Augsburg. Müller died, aged 81, in Rottach-Egern.

Foundation of Judenforschung
Müller would be chosen by the Nazi Party as the official head of the Institut zum Studium der Judenfrage, the Institute for the Study of the Jewish Question, in 1935. The Institut was instrumental in the creation of Judenforschung, an abbreviation of "Erforschung der Judenfrage," "study of the Jewish Question." This was a project on the part of the Nazi state to weaponize historicity in favor of the Nazis and against the populations that they targeted. The point of Judenforschung was to give an academic patina to the Nazi's prejudice against the Jews. It would invent or seek out and overemphasize historical crimes committed by or conflicts with Jewish figures. Judenforschung was also used in the formalizing of the Nazis' race science to determine who did and did not count as Jewish by their standards.

Judenforschung was a part of the Nazis' propaganda campaigns. It served to make their goals appear rational and supported by science and historical record. Müller's Institut was given financial and organizational support directly from Goebbels's propaganda ministry, but it was considered to be more effective and socially acceptable if their connection was kept hidden. The Institut would fall out of favor in later years when more active scholars working within it would accidentally make their connections with Goebbels obvious.

References

1882 births
1964 deaths
Writers from Munich
German male non-fiction writers
Alumni of the University of Oxford
20th-century German historians
Academic staff of the Ludwig Maximilian University of Munich